Tabernaemontana eusepaloides is a species of plant in the family Apocynaceae. It is found in northeastern Madagascar.

References

eusepaloides